Saw U was the chief queen consort of King Athinkhaya of Myinsaing from 1297 to 1310. According to a contemporary inscription, she was a granddaughter of King Uzana of Pagan and Queen Thonlula.

Notes

References

Bibliography
 
 

Pagan dynasty
Myinsaing dynasty
13th-century Burmese women
14th-century Burmese women